Gabriela Peña Romero (born 23 August 1995) is a Dominican footballer who plays as a forward for Bob Soccer FC and the Dominican Republic women's national team.

Club career
Peña has played for Bob Soccer School FC in the Dominican Republic.

References

External links

1995 births
Living people
Dominican Republic women's footballers
Women's association football forwards
Dominican Republic women's international footballers
Competitors at the 2014 Central American and Caribbean Games